The Women's elimination competition at the 2022 UCI Track Cycling World Championships was held on 13 October 2022.

Results
The race was started at 19:57.

References

Women's elimination